The following are the winners of the 12th annual ENnie Awards, held in 2012:

Judges' Spotlight Winners 
Designers & Dragons (Mongoose Publishing)
Edge RPG (Outrider Studios)
Honor + Intrigue (Basic Action Games)
Shelter In Place (Galileo Games)
Technoir (Cellar Games LLC)

Gold and Silver Winners

References

External links
 2012 ENnie Awards

 
ENnies winners